= Airport reference temperature =

Aerodrome reference temperature is defined by ICAO (Convention on International Civil Aviation, Annex 14, Vol. I, 2.4.1) as the monthly mean of the daily maximum temperatures for the hottest month of the year (the hottest month being that which has the highest monthly mean temperature). This temperature should be averaged over a period of years.
